Carteris oculatalis, the dotted carteris moth, is a species of litter moth in the family Erebidae. It is found in southern Florida, Cuba, Puerto Rico, Mexico, Costa Rica and Panama. The species was described by Heinrich Benno Möschler in 1890.

The MONA or Hodges number for Carteris oculatalis is 8391.

References

Further reading

 Arnett, Ross H. (2000). American Insects: A Handbook of the Insects of America North of Mexico. CRC Press.
 Crabo, L.; Davis, M.; Hammond, P.; Mustelin, T. & Shepard, J. (2013). "Five new species and three new subspecies of Erebidae and Noctuidae (Insecta, Lepidoptera) from Northwestern North America, with notes on Chytolita Grote (Erebidae) and Hydraecia Guenée (Noctuidae)". ZooKeys. 264: 85-123.
 Lafontaine, J. Donald & Schmidt, B. Christian (2010). "Annotated check list of the Noctuoidea (Insecta, Lepidoptera) of North America north of Mexico". ZooKeys. 40: 1-239.

Herminiinae
Moths described in 1890